Mudivalla Arambam is a 1984 Indian Tamil-language film directed by N. M. Mohideen, starring Rajesh and Jyothi. It was released on 30 March 1984.

Plot 

Radha, the daughter of a woman who runs a roadside tea stall in a hill village, is educated up to the tenth grSW. Kannaiah, a cargo driver, often visits the tea shop on the way. Both fall in love with each other. Before marriage, the two become physically united. As a result, Radha becomes pregnant. They fix the wedding date. Before that, Kannaiah, who went away on his business, did not return. Radha gives birth to a baby without marriage. She leaves the baby at the door of a charity home, unnoticed, and then joins the same charity home, naming herself as Sita. Her child named John grows up here. A doctor named Ram falls in love with Sita. At some point it becomes clear to everyone that Sita and John are mother and son. After a while, Kannaiah is admitted to a hospital there after losing his sight in an accident during Ram and Sita's wedding. Ram is working in the same hospital and Ram performs an operation to restore Kannaiah's eyesight. The final scene is after Kannaiah's sight returns, to whom Sita joins, either Kannaiya or Ram for marriage.

Cast 
Rajesh
Jyothi
Raghuvaran
Sarath Babu
Kumarimuthu
Master Haja Sharif

Soundtrack 
The soundtrack was composed by Ilaiyaraaja and the lyrics for the songs were written by Vairamuthu, Gangai Amaran and Ravi.

Reception 
Jayamanmadhan of Kalki wrote .

References

External links 
 

1980s Tamil-language films
1984 films
Films scored by Ilaiyaraaja